Mastogloiaceae is a family of diatoms belonging to the order Mastogloiales.

Genera:
 Aneumastus
 Craspedostauros
 Decussata

References

Bacillariophyceae
Diatom families